The Potawatomi Festival is an event held annually in mid September at Ouibache Park in Attica, Indiana.  Begun in 1971 and incorporated in 1979, the festival features food, live musical entertainment, flea markets, crafts and exhibitions of Native American dance and culture.

The festival is named for the Native American Potawatomi tribe.

References
Indiana 2007 Festival Guide. Indiana Office of Tourism Development, 2007. p. 60
www.visitindiana.com. Retrieved 3 June 2007.
www.atticaonline.com/potawatomi. Retrieved 28 January 2007.

External links
Attica website

Festivals in Indiana
Tourist attractions in Fountain County, Indiana